Yellow Dog was a British based rock band from the 1970s. Founded by the American songwriter Kenny Young, who had previously been a founder member of Fox, the band enjoyed a solitary Top 10 hit in the UK Singles Chart in 1978 with "Just One More Night". The single was written and produced by Young. It ends on a humorous note with a telephone call in which the protagonist (a woman) continues to beg to be allowed to stay "just one more night" after being told emphatically "No!", and for this reason is considered something of a novelty song. They made an appearance playing one song, Gee Officer Krupke, on the Kenny Everett Video Show. The band were managed by John Morris, at the time the husband of singer Clodagh Rodgers.

Discography

Studio albums

Singles

Personnel
Kenny Young - guitar, vocals
Phil Palmer - guitar, vocals
Herbie Armstrong - guitar, vocals
Gerry Conway - drums
Jim Gannon - guitar
James SK Wān - keyboards
Andy Roberts - guitar
Gary Taylor - bass guitar

References

External links
 "Just One More Night" lyrics

English rock music groups